The 2008–09 Charlotte Bobcats season was the 19th season of the NBA basketball in Charlotte in the National Basketball Association (NBA), and their 5th as the Charlotte Bobcats.

The previous season, Charlotte finished 32–50 under coach Sam Vincent, and did not qualify for the playoffs. In response to the dismal season, co-owner and basketball operations chief Michael Jordan fired Vincent and brought in veteran coach Larry Brown.  True to his reputation for turning teams around, Brown kept the young team in playoff contention well into April.  They ultimately finished four games short of the first playoff appearance in their current incarnation.

Key dates
 June 26: The 2008 NBA draft took place in New York City.
 July 1: The free agency period.
 March 7: Charlotte recorded its longest winning streak in franchise history at 6 following a 114–105 win over the New York Knicks.

Offseason

2008 NBA draft

Injuries and surgeries

Staff changes
Michael Jordan fired coach Sam Vincent on April 27, 2008 and subsequently signed legendary coach Larry Brown 2 days later.

Roster

Regular season

Standings

Game log

|- bgcolor="#ffcccc"
| 1
| October 30
| @ Cleveland
| 
| Jason Richardson (24)
| Emeka Okafor (12)
| Raymond Felton (5)
| Quicken Loans Arena20,562
| 0–1

|- bgcolor="#ccffcc"
| 2
| November 1
| Miami
| 
| Gerald Wallace (34)
| Emeka Okafor (13)
| Raymond Felton (8)
| Time Warner Cable Arena19,238
| 1–1
|- bgcolor="#ffcccc"
| 3
| November 3
| Detroit
| 
| Shannon Brown (16)
| Gerald Wallace (12)
| Jason Richardson (5)
| Time Warner Cable Arena11,023
| 1–2
|- bgcolor="#ffcccc"
| 4
| November 5
| @ New York
| 
| Raymond Felton (18)
| Emeka Okafor (15)
| Raymond Felton (6)
| Madison Square Garden17,977
| 1–3
|- bgcolor="#ccffcc"
| 5
| November 7
| New Orleans
| 
| Jason Richardson, Raymond Felton (20)
| Emeka Okafor (10)
| D. J. Augustin (4)
| Time Warner Cable Arena13,435
| 2–3
|- bgcolor="#ffcccc"
| 6
| November 9
| Toronto
| 
| D. J. Augustin (14)
| Gerald Wallace (8)
| Raymond Felton (6)
| Time Warner Cable Arena12,111
| 2–4
|- bgcolor="#ffcccc"
| 7
| November 11
| Denver
| 
| Jason Richardson (23)
| Emeka Okafor (8)
| Raymond Felton (5)
| Time Warner Cable Arena10,753
| 2–5
|- bgcolor="#ccffcc"
| 8
| November 14
| Utah
| 
| Raymond Felton (23)
| Gerald Wallace (9)
| Raymond Felton (6)
| Time Warner Cable Arena14,189
| 3–5
|- bgcolor="#ffcccc"
| 9
| November 16
| Orlando
| 
| Gerald Wallace (19)
| Gerald Wallace, Emeka Okafor (9)
| Raymond Felton (6)
| Time Warner Cable Arena12,639
| 3–6
|- bgcolor="#ffcccc"
| 10
| November 18
| Dallas
| 
| D. J. Augustin (21)
| Emeka Okafor (9)
| D. J. Augustin (4)
| Time Warner Cable Arena10,935
| 3–7
|- bgcolor="#ffcccc"
| 11
| November 21
| @ Atlanta
| 
| D. J. Augustin (26)
| Emeka Okafor (11)
| D. J. Augustin (7)
| Philips Arena15,068
| 3–8
|- bgcolor="#ffcccc"
| 12
| November 22
| Milwaukee
| 
| Gerald Wallace (18)
| Emeka Okafor (18)
| Raymond Felton (5)
| Time Warner Cable Arena12,096
| 3–9
|- bgcolor="#ccffcc"
| 13
| November 24
| Philadelphia
| 
| D. J. Augustin (25)
| Emeka Okafor (9)
| D. J. Augustin (11)
| Time Warner Cable Arena10,848
| 4–9
|- bgcolor="#ffcccc"
| 14
| November 26
| @ Toronto
| 
| Gerald Wallace (23)
| Emeka Okafor (14)
| Raymond Felton (7)
| Air Canada Centre17,414
| 4–10
|- bgcolor="#ccffcc"
| 15
| November 28
| @ Indiana
| 
| Raymond Felton (31)
| Emeka Okafor (20)
| Raymond Felton (7)
| Conseco Fieldhouse17,160
| 5–10
|- bgcolor="#ffcccc"
| 16
| November 29
| Boston
| 
| Gerald Wallace (23)
| Gerald Wallace (8)
| Raymond Felton (6)
| Time Warner Cable Arena19,177
| 5–11

|- bgcolor="#ccffcc"
| 17
| December 1
| Minnesota
| 
| Jason Richardson (25)
| Emeka Okafor (10)
| Raymond Felton (14)
| Time Warner Cable Arena9,285
| 6–11
|- bgcolor="#ccffcc"
| 18
| December 3
| Oklahoma City
| 
| Emeka Okafor (25)
| Emeka Okafor (13)
| Raymond Felton (12)
| Time Warner Cable Arena11,629
| 7–11
|- bgcolor="#ffcccc"
| 19
| December 5
| @ Milwaukee
| 
| Jason Richardson (20)
| Emeka Okafor (8)
| Raymond Felton (8)
| Bradley Center14,875
| 7–12
|- bgcolor="#ffcccc"
| 20
| December 6
| Cleveland
| 
| D. J. Augustin (17)
| Emeka Okafor (8)
| Raymond Felton (5)
| Time Warner Cable Arena19,133
| 7–13
|- bgcolor="#ffcccc"
| 21
| December 8
| @ Miami
| 
| Jason Richardson (24)
| Emeka Okafor (12)
| Raymond Felton (8)
| American Airlines Arena15,024
| 7–14
|- bgcolor="#ffcccc"
| 22
| December 10
| @ New Orleans
| 
| D. J. Augustin (28)
| Emeka Okafor (8)
| D. J. Augustin (7)
| New Orleans Arena15,750
| 7–15
|- bgcolor="#ffcccc"
| 23
| December 11
| @ Dallas
| 
| Emeka Okafor (27)
| Emeka Okafor (17)
| D. J. Augustin (10)
| American Airlines Center19,736
| 7–16
|- bgcolor="#ffcccc"
| 24
| December 13
| Detroit
| 
| Gerald Wallace (22)
| Emeka Okafor (12)
| Boris Diaw (5)
| Time Warner Cable Arena17,373
| 7–17
|- bgcolor="#ffcccc"
| 25
| December 15
| @ Atlanta
| 
| Boris Diaw (25)
| Emeka Okafor (11)
| Raymond Felton (7)
| Philips Arena12,733
| 7–18
|- bgcolor="#ccffcc"
| 26
| December 16
| Chicago
| 
| D. J. Augustin (29)
| Emeka Okafor (13)
| D. J. Augustin, Raymond Felton (7)
| Time Warner Cable Arena11,225
| 8–18
|- bgcolor="#ccffcc"
| 27
| December 19
| @ Memphis
| 
| Boris Diaw (26)
| Boris Diaw (10)
| D. J. Augustin (10)
| FedExForum11,869
| 9–18
|- bgcolor="#ffcccc"
| 28
| December 20
| Golden State
| 
| Gerald Wallace (26)
| Emeka Okafor (13)
| Raymond Felton (8)
| Time Warner Cable Arena13,068
| 9–19
|- bgcolor="#ccffcc"
| 29
| December 23
| Washington
| 
| Emeka Okafor (29)
| Emeka Okafor (18)
| Raymond Felton (8)
| Time Warner Cable Arena13,776
| 10–19
|- bgcolor="#ccffcc"
| 30
| December 26
| @ New Jersey
| 
| Raymond Felton (22)
| Gerald Wallace (13)
| Boris Diaw (7)
| Izod Center16,852
| 11–19
|- bgcolor="#ffcccc"
| 31
| December 27
| New Jersey
| 
| Gerald Wallace (32)
| Emeka Okafor (10)
| Boris Diaw (7)
| Time Warner Cable Arena15,837
| 11–20
|- bgcolor="#ffcccc"
| 32
| December 30
| New York
| 
| Gerald Wallace (21)
| Emeka Okafor (15)
| Raymond Felton (8)
| Time Warner Cable Arena15,108
| 11–21

|- bgcolor="#ffcccc"
| 33
| January 2
| @ Milwaukee
| 
| Boris Diaw (16)
| Emeka Okafor (12)
| Boris Diaw (6)
| Bradley Center15,107
| 11–22
|- bgcolor="#ccffcc"
| 34
| January 3
| Milwaukee
| 
| Gerald Wallace (24)
| Boris Diaw, Raymond Felton, Emeka Okafor (6)
| Boris Diaw (7)
| Time Warner Cable Arena14,201
| 12–22
|- bgcolor="#ccffcc"
| 35
| January 6
| Boston
| 
| Raymond Felton (25)
| Emeka Okafor (17)
| Raymond Felton (8)
| Time Warner Cable Arena17,112
| 13–22
|- bgcolor="#ffcccc"
| 36
| January 7
| @ Cleveland
| 
| Raymond Felton (15)
| Boris Diaw (8)
| Boris Diaw (6)
| Quicken Loans Arena20,562
| 13–23
|- bgcolor="#ffcccc"
| 37
| January 9
| @ Philadelphia
| 
| Emeka Okafor (24)
| Emeka Okafor (11)
| Raymond Felton (8)
| Wachovia Center14,235
| 13–24
|- bgcolor="#ccffcc"
| 38
| January 10
| @ Washington
| 
| Raja Bell (19)
| Emeka Okafor (6)
| Raymond Felton (11)
| Verizon Center20,173
| 14–24
|- bgcolor="#ccffcc"
| 39
| January 13
| @ Detroit
| 
| Raymond Felton (23)
| Gerald Wallace (10)
| Raymond Felton (9)
| The Palace of Auburn Hills22,076
| 15–24
|- bgcolor="#ccffcc"
| 40
| January 17
| Portland
| 
| Gerald Wallace (31)
| Gerald Wallace (16)
| Raymond Felton, Boris Diaw (7)
| Time Warner Cable Arena17,482
| 16–24
|- bgcolor="#ffcccc"
| 41
| January 19
| San Antonio
| 
| Raja Bell (25)
| Boris Diaw (13)
| Raymond Felton (9)
| Time Warner Cable Arena16,160
| 16–25
|- bgcolor="#ccffcc"
| 42
| January 21
| Memphis
| 
| Raja Bell (25)
| Emeka Okafor (15)
| Gerald Wallace (9)
| Time Warner Cable Arena11,249
| 17–25
|- bgcolor="#ccffcc"
| 43
| January 23
| Phoenix
| 
| Gerald Wallace (28)
| Boris Diaw (11)
| Raja Bell (8)
| Time Warner Cable Arena19,104
| 18–25
|- bgcolor="#ffcccc"
| 44
| January 25
| @ Indiana
| 
| Raja Bell, Boris Diaw (18)
| Emeka Okafor (8)
| Raymond Felton (12)
| Conseco Fieldhouse10,936
| 18–26
|- bgcolor="#ccffcc"
| 45
| January 27
| @ L.A. Lakers
| 
| Boris Diaw (23)
| Raymond Felton, Emeka Okafor (11)
| Boris Diaw, Raymond Felton (9)
| Staples Center18,997
| 19–26
|- bgcolor="#ffcccc"
| 46
| January 28
| @ Portland
| 
| Emeka Okafor (18)
| Emeka Okafor, Raymond Felton (5)
| Raymond Felton (8)
| Rose Garden20,380
| 19–27
|- bgcolor="#ffcccc"
| 47
| January 30
| @ Denver
| 
| Raja Bell (27)
| DeSagana Diop (7)
| Raymond Felton (9)
| Pepsi Center18,463
| 19–28

|- bgcolor="#ffcccc"
| 48
| February 2
| @ Utah
| 
| Raymond Felton (16)
| Emeka Okafor (7)
| Raymond Felton (9)
| EnergySolutions Arena19,911
| 19–29
|- bgcolor="#ffcccc"
| 49
| February 6
| Atlanta
| 
| Raja Bell (17)
| Emeka Okafor (19)
| Raymond Felton (8)
| Time Warner Cable Arena15,140
| 19–30
|- bgcolor="#ffcccc"
| 50
| February 8
| @ Miami
| 
| D. J. Augustin (27)
| Emeka Okafor (8)
| Raymond Felton (11)
| American Airlines Arena17,656
| 19–31
|- bgcolor="#ccffcc"
| 51
| February 9
| L.A. Clippers
| 
| Emeka Okafor (19)
| Emeka Okafor (16)
| Boris Diaw (9)
| Time Warner Cable Arena10,852
| 20–31
|- bgcolor="#ccffcc"
| 52
| February 11
| Washington
| 
| D. J. Augustin (24)
| Emeka Okafor (13)
| Raymond Felton (9)
| Time Warner Cable Arena10,237
| 21–31
|- bgcolor="#ffcccc"
| 53
| February 17
| @ Orlando
| 
| Raymond Felton (22)
| Raymond Felton (10)
| Raymond Felton (5)
| Amway Arena17,461
| 21–32
|- bgcolor="#ccffcc"
| 54
| February 18
| Indiana
| 
| Gerald Wallace (25)
| Emeka Okafor (12)
| Gerald Wallace (7)
| Time Warner Cable Arena12,374
| 22–32
|- bgcolor="#ffcccc"
| 55
| February 20
| Orlando
| 
| Raymond Felton (16)
| Emeka Okafor (11)
| Raymond Felton (5)
| Time Warner Cable Arena19,244
| 22–33
|- bgcolor="#ffcccc"
| 56
| February 22
| @ Houston
| 
| Boris Diaw, Emeka Okafor, Raymond Felton (13)
| Emeka Okafor (11)
| Raymond Felton (4)
| Toyota Center17,124
| 22–34
|- bgcolor="#ffcccc"
| 57
| February 24
| @ Phoenix
| 
| Boris Diaw (27)
| Boris Diaw (10)
| Raymond Felton (9)
| US Airways Center18,422
| 22–35
|- bgcolor="#ccffcc"
| 58
| February 25
| @ Sacramento
| 
| Gerald Wallace (27)
| Emeka Okafor (11)
| Raymond Felton (9)
| ARCO Arena10,439
| 23–35
|- bgcolor="#ccffcc"
| 59
| February 27
| @ Golden State
| 
| Raymond Felton (26)
| Gerald Wallace, Emeka Okafor (11)
| Raymond Felton (9)
| Oracle Arena18,653
| 24–35
|- bgcolor="#ccffcc"
| 60
| February 28
| @ L.A. Clippers
| 
| Emeka Okafor (28)
| Emeka Okafor, Gerald Wallace (9)
| D. J. Augustin (8)
| Staples Center16,349
| 25–35

|- bgcolor="#ccffcc"
| 61
| March 3
| Chicago
| 
| Raymond Felton, Raja Bell (18)
| Emeka Okafor (10)
| Raymond Felton (9)
| Time Warner Cable Arena14,216
| 26–35
|- bgcolor="#ccffcc"
| 62
| March 6
| Atlanta
| 
| Gerald Wallace (21)
| Emeka Okafor (11)
| Boris Diaw (13)
| Time Warner Cable Arena15,058
| 27–35
|- bgcolor="#ccffcc"
| 63
| March 7
| @ New York
| 
| Gerald Wallace (23)
| Gerald Wallace (13)
| Raymond Felton (10)
| Madison Square Garden19,763
| 28–35
|- bgcolor="#ffcccc"
| 64
| March 10
| @ San Antonio
| 
| Emeka Okafor, Raja Bell (16)
| DeSagana Diop, Gerald Wallace (7)
| Boris Diaw (8)
| AT&T Center18,254
| 28–36
|- bgcolor="#ffcccc"
| 65
| March 13
| Houston
| 
| Gerald Wallace (17)
| Gerald Wallace, Emeka Okafor (8)
| Raymond Felton (8)
| Time Warner Cable Arena16,809
| 28–37
|- bgcolor="#ffcccc"
| 66
| March 14
| @ Minnesota
| 
| Gerald Wallace (26)
| Gerald Wallace (10)
| Raymond Felton (5)
| Target Center15,276
| 28–38
|- bgcolor="#ccffcc"
| 67
| March 16
| Toronto
| 
| Gerald Wallace (25)
| Vladimir Radmanović, Gerald Wallace (9)
| Raymond Felton (8)
| Time Warner Cable Arena11,349
| 29–38
|- bgcolor="#ccffcc"
| 68
| March 18
| Sacramento
| 
| Gerald Wallace (25)
| Gerald Wallace (12)
| Raymond Felton (7)
| Time Warner Cable Arena13,594
| 30–38
|- bgcolor="#ccffcc"
| 69
| March 20
| @ Toronto
| 
| Boris Diaw, Gerald Wallace (30)
| Gerald Wallace (9)
| Gerald Wallace (8)
| Air Canada Centre18,641
| 31–38
|- bgcolor="#ffcccc"
| 70
| March 21
| Indiana
| 
| Boris Diaw (15)
| Emeka Okafor (9)
| Raymond Felton, Gerald Wallace (5)
| Time Warner Cable Arena15,721
| 31–39
|- bgcolor="#ffcccc"
| 71
| March 25
| @ Washington
| 
| Gerald Wallace (21)
| Gerald Wallace (11)
| Raymond Felton (8)
| Verizon Center14,657
| 31–40
|- bgcolor="#ccffcc"
| 72
| March 27
| @ Philadelphia
| 
| Boris Diaw (24)
| Gerald Wallace (11)
| Boris Diaw (6)
| Wachovia Center19,098
| 32–40
|- bgcolor="#ccffcc"
| 73
| March 28
| New York
| 
| Gerald Wallace (23)
| Emeka Okafor (14)
| Gerald Wallace (8)
| Time Warner Cable Arena19,133
| 33–40
|- bgcolor="#ccffcc"
| 74
| March 31
| L.A. Lakers
| 
| Gerald Wallace (21)
| Gerald Wallace (13)
| Boris Diaw (12)
| Time Warner Cable Arena19,568
| 34–40

|- bgcolor="#ffcccc"
| 75
| April 1
| @ Boston
| 
| Gerald Wallace (20)
| Gerald Wallace, Emeka Okafor (10)
| Raymond Felton (12)
| TD Banknorth Garden18,624
| 34–41
|- bgcolor="#ffcccc"
| 76
| April 3
| Miami
| 
| Gerald Wallace (21)
| Emeka Okafor (13)
| Raymond Felton (10)
| Time Warner Cable Arena19,568
| 34–42
|- bgcolor="#ffcccc"
| 77
| April 5
| @ Detroit
| 
| D. J. Augustin (22)
| Emeka Okafor (16)
| Boris Diaw (6)
| The Palace of Auburn Hills22,076
| 34–43
|- bgcolor="#ccffcc"
| 78
| April 7
| Philadelphia
| 
| Raymond Felton (32)
| Emeka Okafor (12)
| Boris Diaw, D. J. Augustin (6)
| Time Warner Cable Arena16,499
| 35–43
|- bgcolor="#ffcccc"
| 79
| April 10
| @ Oklahoma City
| 
| D. J. Augustin (20)
| Gerald Wallace (14)
| Raymond Felton (5)
| Ford Center19,136
| 35–44
|- bgcolor="#ffcccc"
| 80
| April 11
| @ Chicago
| 
| Raymond Felton (26)
| Emeka Okafor (14)
| D. J. Augustin (8)
| United Center20,265
| 35–45
|- bgcolor="#ffcccc"
| 81
| April 13
| @ New Jersey
| 
| Raymond Felton (19)
| DeSagana Diop, Boris Diaw, Emeka Okafor (5)
| Raymond Felton (5)
| Izod Center14,519
| 35–46
|- bgcolor="#ffcccc"
| 82
| April 15
| @ Orlando
| 
| Raymond Felton (13)
| Gerald Wallace (10)
| Dontell Jefferson (4)
| Amway Arena17,461
| 35–47

Player statistics

*Total for entire season including previous team(s)

Awards, records and milestones
NBA All-Rookie Second Team
 D. J. Augustin

Transactions
 On July 7, the Bobcats hired Herb Brown to be an assistant coach. Herb Brown spent the past four seasons as an assistant in Atlanta. Charlotte is the ninth team he's worked for as an assistant. He served as head coach in Pistons for three seasons from 1975–78.
 On July 25, the Bobcats agreed to terms with restricted free agent Ryan Hollins.
 On July 29, the Bobcats agreed to terms with restricted free agent Emeka Okafor. The Charlotte Observer reported the deal is for six years and $72 million.

Trades

Free agents

Additions

Subtractions

References

Charlotte Bobcats seasons
Charlotte
Bob
Bob